Kuštanovci Slovenija (Prekmurje Slovene: Küštanovci) is a village in the Municipality of Puconci in the Prekmurje region of Slovenia.

There is a small chapel with a belfry by the village cemetery, built in the early 20th century.

Notable people
Notable people that were born or lived in Kuštanovci include:
Feri Horvat (born 1941 in Kuštanovci, lived in Radenci, died 2021), politician

References

External links
Kuštanovci on Geopedia

Populated places in the Municipality of Puconci